John Dinges (December 8, 1941) is an American journalist. He was special correspondent for Time, Washington Post and ABC Radio in Chile. With a group of Chilean journalists, he cofounded the Chilean magazine APSI. 
He is the Godfrey Lowell Cabot Professor of International Journalism at Columbia University Graduate School of Journalism, a position he held from 1996–2016, currently with emeritus status.

Early life and career
John Dinges was born in Iowa.
He studied to become a Catholic priest for seven years.
His first job in journalism was at the Des Moines Register and Tribune.
He obtained a Masters Degree from Stanford University in Latin American studies.

He worked on the foreign desk of The Washington Post, traveling as a reporter to cover the civil wars in El Salvador, Guatemala and Nicaragua. 
From 1972 to 1978 Dinges lived in Chile, "one of the few American journalists to live in Chile during its most violent period of military rule". He helped create three Chilean media organizations: APSI/Actualidad Internacional in 1976, under intense military censorship which became one of the leading investigative news magazines exposing the abuses of the military.

In collaboration with investigative journalists Jorge Escalante, Pascal Bonnefoy, María Olivia Mönckeberg and Maria Jose Vilches, he created ArchivosChile, which carried out groundbreaking investigations exploring the secret documentary record of the military government. ArchivosChile was based for several years in the University of Chile’s communications school, ICEI. The non-profit fundraising vehicle for the latter two projects has been the U.S.-based Center for Investigation and Information (CIINFO) of Washington DC.

From 1985 to 1996 he worked at National Public Radio as deputy senior foreign editor, managing editor, and editorial director.

From 1996–2016 he was the Godfrey Lowell Cabot Professor of International Journalism at Columbia University Graduate School of Journalism, currently emeritus. In 2007 while in Chile for six-months as a visiting professor at Universidad Alberto Hurtado, he created an investigative journalism center with Monica González, one of Chile’s most prominent investigative reporters, whose newspaper Siete Mas Siete had just been closed, the Centro de Investigación e Información Periodística (CIPER).

Personal life
Dinges married Carolina Kenrick. They have 3 children; Tomas was born in Santiago in 1977 and lives and works in Chile, Sebastián and Camila were born in Washington DC.

Books

 Assassination on Embassy Row (Pantheon 1980), with Saul Landau, on Orlando Letelier's murder; finalist for the Edgar Allan Poe Award 1981 for "Best Fact Crime".
Our Man in Panama (Random House 1990); book on Manuel Noriega 
 The Condor Years: How Pinochet and his Allies Brought Terrorism to Three Continents, The New Press 2003, about Operation Condor.
Sound Reporting: The NPR Guide to Radio Reporting and Production (editor),
Independence and Integrity (editor).

Awards
Maria Moors Cabot Prize for excellence in Latin American reporting
 Latin American Studies Media Award
two Alfred I. Dupont-Columbia University Awards (as NPR Managing Editor).
 
He serves on the advisory boards of Human Rights Watch and the National Security Archive, and is a juror for the Maria Moors Cabot Prizes and the du-Pont Columbia awards.

References

External links 
www.johndinges.com
Faculty page
Articles for The Nation
 

Living people
American book editors
American foreign policy writers
American male non-fiction writers
American radio reporters and correspondents
American male journalists
Maria Moors Cabot Prize winners
The Washington Post people
Columbia University faculty
Columbia University Graduate School of Journalism faculty
Operation Condor
1941 births